Wirkkala is a surname. Notable people with the surname include:

, Finnish architect
Oscar Wirkkala (1880–1959), Finnish-American logger and inventor
Tapio Wirkkala (1915–1985), Finnish designer and sculptor
Teemu Wirkkala (born 1984), Finnish javelin thrower